Sami Jauhojärvi (born 5 May 1981) is a Finnish former cross-country skier who competed between 2000 and 2017. At the 2014 Winter Olympics, he won men's team sprint with Iivo Niskanen. Germany launched a protest over the result due to a final-leg collision between Jauhojärvi and Tim Tscharnke, but it was rejected by the jury. Jauhojärvi's Finland finished fifth in the 4 x 10 km relay in Vancouver in 2010.

Jauhojärvi won his first medal at the FIS Nordic World Ski Championships 2009 in Liberec with a bronze in the team sprint with Ville Nousiainen, and then added a second in the 4 × 10 km relay. Jauhojärvi has won one World Cup race; in Trondheim 2009 he won the 50 km classic mass start competition.

Cross-country skiing results
All results are sourced from the International Ski Federation (FIS).

Olympic Games
 1 medal – (1 gold)

World Championships
 3 medals – (3 bronze)

World Cup

Season standings

Individual podiums
1 victory – (1 )
9 podiums – (6 , 3 )

Team podiums

2 podiums – (1 , 1 )

Awards
Finnish Sports Personality of the Year: 2014 (shared with Iivo Niskanen)

References

External links

 
 
 

1981 births
Living people
People from Ylitornio
Finnish male cross-country skiers
Cross-country skiers at the 2006 Winter Olympics
Cross-country skiers at the 2010 Winter Olympics
Cross-country skiers at the 2014 Winter Olympics
Olympic cross-country skiers of Finland
Medalists at the 2014 Winter Olympics
Olympic gold medalists for Finland
Olympic medalists in cross-country skiing
FIS Nordic World Ski Championships medalists in cross-country skiing
Tour de Ski skiers
Sportspeople from Lapland (Finland)